John W. McGowan is an American attorney and politician. A Republican, he represents the 97th District of the New York State Assembly.

Career
After graduation from New York Law School, McGowan served as an Assistant District Attorney in The Bronx and a Senior Assistant District Attorney in his home county of Rockland. He was first elected to public office in 2019, as a member of the Rockland County Legislature from the 15th District. The 15th District included parts of Orangetown, Clarkstown, and Chestnut Ridge.

In late 2022, McGowan announced plans to run for District 97 of the New York State Assembly after incumbent Mike Lawler retired to run for federal congress. He won the election against Democratic challenger Eudson Francois and was sworn in on January 1, 2023.

Personal life
Currently, McGowan lives in Pearl River with his wife, Christine, and their two dogs.

References

External links
Assembly site
Campaign site

Republican Party members of the New York State Assembly
Living people
Year of birth missing (living people)